Willem Jacobus "Wim" Eijk (born 22 June 1953) is a Dutch prelate of the Catholic Church, a cardinal since 2012. He has been the Metropolitan Archbishop of Utrecht since 2007. He was Bishop of Groningen-Leeuwarden from 1999 to 2007. Before his clerical career he worked as a doctor; as a priest he made medical ethics the focus of his academic studies.

Early life and studies
Willem Jacobus Eijk was born on 22 June 1953 in Duivendrecht, North Holland, Netherlands. Eijk studied medicine at the University of Amsterdam and received his degree in 1978. In 1978 and 1979 he worked as a doctor specializing in internal medicine. He studied for the priesthood at the seminary of Rolduc in Kerkrade. Beginning in 1979 he combined his theological formation with the study of medical ethics at Leiden University. He was ordained to priesthood in 1985 and was incardinated in the Diocese of Roermond. Then he went to work as a curate in the parish of St. Anthony of Padua in Venlo Blerick.

In 1987 he earned a doctorate in medicine from the University of Leiden, with a dissertation about euthanasia. In 1990 he completed a PhD in philosophy at the Pontifical University of St. Thomas Aquinas (Angelicum) with a dissertation entitled The ethical problems of genetic engineering of human beings. Eijk also earned a master's degree and doctorate in theology at the Pontifical Lateran University in Rome. At the same time he taught moral theology at the seminary of Rolduc. From 1996, Eijk was professor of moral theology in pontifical Faculty of Theology in Lugano, Switzerland. From 1997 to 1999 he was a member of the International Theological Commission.

Bishop and Archbishop
Eijk was appointed Bishop of Groningen-Leeuwarden on 17 July 1999 and consecrated a bishop on 6 November. He chose the motto  ("Do not reject the work"), taken from the last words of Martin of Tours. As bishop he restricted the role of the laity in church services in comparison with past practice.

Pope John Paul II named him a member of the Pontifical Academy for Life on 4 August 2004 and a member of its governing council on 23 March 2005.

In 2001 Wim Eijk suffered from a subdural hematoma from which he fully recovered.

On 11 December 2007 Pope Benedict XVI appointed Eijk the Metropolitan Archbishop of Utrecht
 On 26 January 2008 he was installed in St. Catharine's Cathedral in Utrecht. He is the 70th successor of Saint Willibrord (658–739) as head of that see.

In May 2008 Pope Benedict appointed Eijk a member of the Congregation for the Clergy.

He co-edited the Manual of Catholic Medical Ethics: Responsible Healthcare from a Catholic Perspective, published in 2010.

He was elected president of the Episcopal Conference of the Netherlands in 2011.

On 18 February 2012, Pope Benedict XVI made Eijk a cardinal along with 21 others. He was created Cardinal-Priest of San Callisto. On 21 April he was named a member of the Congregation for Catholic Education. He was one of the cardinal electors who participated in the 2013 papal conclave that elected Pope Francis.

Pope Francis named him a member of the Pontifical Council for the Laity on 6 February 2014.

In late 2013 Pope Francis agreed to a one-day visit to Amsterdam, a city omitted from Pope John Paul's visit to the Netherlands in 1985. Earlier plans were reportedly blocked by Eijk because he anticipated a lack of public enthusiasm.

As Archbishop of Utrecht, he has recommended a restructuring of the diocese's 326 parishes into 48 territories, following a pattern throughout Europe in the face of shrinking church attendance. He has insisted of that plan despite some popular resistance. He said: "When I spoke to the pope, I warned that old church structures wouldn't exist by the time I retired – and that by 2025 two-thirds of our churches would have been withdrawn from divine worship.

Positions

In June 2015 Eijk ordered the removal of Rhianna Gralike, the transgender treasurer of the Norbertus Parish for eastern Flevoland and Northern Veluwe, over the objections of the parish board.

In 2015 Eijk was elected to represent the Episcopal Conference of the Netherlands at the Synod Bishops on the Family in October. In advance of the Synod he published an essay stating that couples entering into a civil remarriage without having received annulments of earlier marriages represent "a form of structured and institutionalized adultery." Following the synod, he became a critic of Pope Francis' Amoris laetitia. In 2018, he said the document had "caused doubt to be sown" and said Francis should state more clearly that marriage is "one and unbreakable" and that a Catholic who remarries after divorce must be denied Communion.

In May 2018, after Pope Francis failed to reject a draft proposal on the part of the German Bishops' Conference to allow Protestants in certain cases access to Communion, Eijk wrote that Francis was failing to defend "the clear doctrine and practice of the Church" and that this represented "a drift towards apostasy from the Truth".

References

External links

 
 

1953 births
Archbishops of Utrecht
Cardinals created by Pope Benedict XVI
Dutch cardinals
International Theological Commission
Leiden University alumni
Living people
Members of the Congregation for Catholic Education
Members of the Congregation for the Clergy
People from Ouder-Amstel
Pontifical University of Saint Thomas Aquinas alumni
Pontifical Lateran University alumni
Roman Catholic bishops of Groningen-Leeuwarden
University of Amsterdam alumni
Dutch Roman Catholic archbishops